The cinema of Cameroon includes French and English-language filmmaking. The Anglophone film industry is sometimes known as Collywood.

History
In 1919, the movie Haut-Commissariat de la République française au Cameroun was shot in the French Cameroons.

In 1960, Cameroon became an independent country, and the history of Cameroonian cinema started in 1962.

Thérèse Sita Bella and Jean Pierre Dikonguè Pipa were the first Cameroonian movie producers. Other names in early Cameroonian cinema included Alphonse Béni who had studied  Film technique at the Conservatoire libre du cinéma français (CLCF), and  Daniel Kamwa who had studied film at the Université de Paris 8-Vincennes. The first movie shot in Cameroon after the independence was Point de Vue No. 1, directed by Dia Moukouri, which did not appear in the market until 1966.

Before 1973, approximately 15 short and long films were produced, with financial support from the French Ministry of Cooperation, and technical support from the French Cultural Centers (CCF – centres culturels français). In 1972, there were about 32 movie theaters across Cameroon by Film Industry Development Fund (FODIC – Fonds du développement de l’industrie cinématographique) sponsored by the Government of Cameroon at the time.

In the 1970s and 1980s, a number of films were produced in Cameroon, including Muna Moto by Jean-Pierre Dikonguè, who was awarded the Golden Stallion (The Étalon d’or de Yennenga is the supreme prize) at the Panafrican Film and Television Festival of Ouagadougou (FESPACO – festival panafricain de cinéma et de télévision de Ouagadougou) in 1976.

In the 1980s there were several cinemas in Yaounde and Douala, which subsequently shut down, and movies are instead shown at mobile cinemas.

Ninah's Dowry was produced in Sabga Hills, in Bamenda. It won more than 30 awards. Beleh is another movie which has received 10 awards.

The Cameroon International Film Festival was first held in 2016.

Cameroon Film Industry (CFI) 

The history of Cameroon filmmaking dates back to 1962, two years after independence when there was no digital technology and film production was analog and very expensive, during which independent French filmmakers like Jean Paul Ngassa, Dikonge Pipa, Sita Bella, Alphonse Benny and others with actors like Gerald Essomba who formed the first generation of filmmakers in Cameroon made remarkable strides in the national and international milieu to revive the seventh art while shooting on the very expensive and scarce film technology at that time.  This was closely followed by a second generation of filmmakers such as Jean Marie Tenu, Daniel Kamwa's pouss pouss and Dikongue Pipa's Muna Moto feature films in 1972/1975 respectively stepped up the level of the local industry at the time with national and international recognition. Jean père Bikolo, Baseck Bakobio and a few others are the last generation of filmmakers who shot on the analog film technology and are still engaging in film productions but this time with the modern digital video equipment which brought a major transformation in the early 1990s in Africa. This generation which overlaps into the digital film age is still impacting the film industry through their individual efforts to be recognized in the industry at home and abroad.

Following the continuous strides for evolution and the quest of local filmmakers to propagate the film making art with the coming of Cameroon television (CTV) in 1985, inspired new filmmakers including English filmmakers who, through Victor Pungong of blessed memory in 1987, produced ‘‘Trials of passion’’ the first-ever English film aired on national television with its second version (series) in 2004 starring veterans like Claude Henry Ndenge, Chinepoh Corson, Yijika Solange, Yimbu Emmanuel, Njoya Grace, Chi Anthony, Tita Ernestine... most of whom got their entrance into the mainstream industry then.

Eleven years later, after many passionate filmmakers of English expression like Nfuh ebenezer, Njiforti Victor, and Thomas Belton continue to push ahead this film making passion. The influence of the Nigerian film industry in the mid-1990s also contributed greatly in the building process of the 7th arts in the west of the mungo through major co-productions initiated by local film producers with Nollywood with main intention to stimulate the local productions and give the local film industry steam. Within this period local film producer/director like Thomas Beltin of blessed memory produced and directed Heavens forbid (2000), switching heart (2002), Mission to Damunza (2003) which also starred local daring actors at the time like Moma Pascal (Bob), Fanny Fungong, Mbuta Sylvie, Chatoh Collins, and Lyno Lovet.

Akonte Cyril of Splash network initiated the first-ever major Cameroon-Nigerian film project, Peace Offering,  which they produced and was directed by Amayo Phillips, starring Nollywood/Cameroonian actors like Patience Ozukwo, Fabien Adibe Nonso Diobi, Tangie suh Nfor, Menye Patra, Cy Wanki and the list goes on.  Inspired by this movie other passionate film enthusiast like Agbor Gilbert Ebot and Felix Alote initiated another Cameroon/Nigerian co production same year this time with another Nigerian born producer/director Oscar Benson in the movie titled The return of Mbombo which featured Vugar Samson, Nsuh George, Ngeh Gerald, Agbor Gilbert, with Nguffo Serge N. as associate producer. Ghis movie ended in a fiasco with numerous setbacks encountered in the process ; their awful experiences pushed them to brainstorm on their way back of the creation of an ‘organ’ which could handle basic issues about actors rights and wellbeing realised a year later in 2004 today known as the National Actors Guild of Cameroon with its founding president Vugar Samson. Within this period, other local productions were also springing up in the southwest region before the big blast of Agbor Gilbert Ebot in 2005 with his maiden Cameroon/Nigerian co-production titled Before the Sunrise which he produced and was directed by Fred Amata starring ‘Giant’ Nollywood actors like Clarion Chukwura, Olu Jacobs, Dakore and featuring local actors at the time like Ivanne Namme, Quinta Eyoung Ashu, Agbor Magdalene, Jean Père Esome and Lyno lovet.

Two years on precisely in 2006, Joe Walkie of the Joe Walkie Foundation in Kumba also produced the ‘Sacrament ‘ starring local actors at the time such as Alene Menget (recently decorated with the medal of the knight of the order of valour by the head of state alongside Quinta Eyong Ashu) and directed by a Nigerian Director since the industry did not have a local director whose work could convince local producers at the time to entrust such a huge responsibility.

It is worth acknowledging that these early efforts outstandingly stimulated the local industry as was intended by these pioneers and in 2008 after the visit of Africa's lone movie channel at the time African Magic on the invitation of Agbor Gilbert Ebot to identify and expose local talents in the entertainment industry. It was within this period that stakeholders who have not had the opportunity to converge together and talk about the envious film industry which was at its peak at the time in neighboring Nigeria decided to come up with a structure which was non-existent that could locally or beyond, address the poor working conditions, low wages, lack of technical know-how. The already existing verdant hills of Yibain Emile Aime Chah was laid to rest for an inclusive structure to be put in place for the interest of all in the Buea meeting of 2008.  Through respective conventions and assemblies from Kumba, Bamenda, Yaounde where the name Collywood was adopted and finally in Buea on 3 June 2008 when the Cameroon Film Industry Collywood was initiated.  It is imperative to mention that the challenge of the creation of "Collywood" was the problem of the dissolution of NAGCAM (National Actors Guild of Cameroon) which was the only recognized structure created in 2004 to protect the stakeholders which were mostly actors to come up with a single unanimous guild. There was solid resistance at the Bamenda convention in 2007 from the founding president Vugar Samsom who was alarmed that NAGCAM was a syndicate and not an association and can not be dissolved rather other existing bodies should be incorporated into it.

A caretaker committee was set up in Kumba in November of that same year and Waa Nkeng Musi was commissioned to organise and set up the six identified guilds which included the Actors Guild, Producers Guild, Directors Guild, Technician Guild, Writers Guild and Marketing and Distribution Guild. He was commissioned alongside zonal coordinators in various identified zones like Bamenda, Kumba, Buea and Yaounde to identify and group registered members within these guilds within a three years lapse. It is important to also note that Moma Pascal Gamih founded CAMAG and incorporated actors into the actors Guild of CFI as part of the objective given to the Musi-led government in the Kumba convention. This later became a point of contention within the industry which split the actors into the NAGCAM/ CAMAG divide with NAGCAM proving itself as a syndicate with legalized documents which can't be subdued by another organ thus in August 2014 in a dual extraordinary general assembly/election in the town of friendship (Limbe), NAGCAM swallowed CAMAG in a unanimous agreement between parties to be the lone organ to represent the actors guild of Cameroon under CFI moments before Moma Pascal emerged victorious as the first-ever democratically elected actors guild president of CFI in the presence of board chairman Otia Vitalis, some board members including the secretary general Alasambom Nyinchou, the communications officer Tanwie Elvis, Musing Derick and Vugar Samson the founding father of NAGCAM.  This actors' union later between parties later part ways after the premature impeachment of Moma Pascal as actors guild president with huge antagonism on his part decided to withdraw CAMAG from the union till date, leaving NAGCAM as the sole organ responsible for the identification, registration and incorporation of actors into the Actors Guild of CFI.  All the above events and attributes have been the elements that have molded and build every antagonistic tendencies in form of ‘’camps’’ within the industry either directly or indirectly.

The interim body of the Musi-led government whose mandate was to terminate in three years in November 2011 extended to March 23, 2013, at the central library in Yaounde when stakeholders clamoured for a change motivated by some individuals insisting about the inability of the interim bureau to meet up with its mandate. It was in the presence of Akim Macaulay the US-based CFI representative, Dr Fai Donatus and the then minister Amah Tutu Muna's representative; the director of cinema that the Musi lead interim bureau was replaced with Otia Vitalis Suh who is the first elected board-chair of the Cameroon film industry; whose mandate equally terminated prematurely at the end of his three years reign in March 2016 to give way to Mbeaoh Alex who is few months into his second term since March 2019.

Not leaving out some important contributors prior to the industry's evolution, there have been some dedicated and daring filmmakers whose direct or indirect contributions has propagated the industry to where it is today in the likes of Godlove Neba Nyambi Jr, Ngatou Noutossi Glaradip, Molimi Cletus, Zigoto Tchaya, Angu Elisabeth, Neba Lawrence, Waa Nkeng Musi, Chinepo Corsson, Tanwie Elvis De Dadies, Alenne Menget, Ashu Egbe, Njamsi Roland, Itambi Delphine, Amandy Alfred, Akim Macaulay, Awah Oliver, Claude Henry Ndegue, Yibain Emile Chah, Anurine Nwanembom, Ngouffo Serge N., Musing Derick, Elung Brenda Shay, Chatoh Collins, Billy Bob Ndive, Nkwah Kingsly, Princess Manka, Tanko Francoise, Chi Anthony, Enah John Scott, Nkanya Nkwai, Achile Brice, Asaba Ferdinand, Musing Derick, Keka Sylvester, Nsuh George, Elvis Smart, PD Cash, Esua Julius, Nkwah Kingsly, Nwanna Goffi, Ngongan Matheu/Joe Walkie/Glory M. of blessed memory, Aisha Innoua, Kucha, Akuro Titus, Ala Leo, Agbor steeve (Big steeve), Syndy Emade, Asah Elvis, Akuro Rapheal, Godwin Nganah, Sylvanus Awae, Takong Delvis, Enow Tanjong, Agbor Obed Agbor, Awemu Pius, Ivanne Namme, Alfred Melo.

It is exactly eleven years, three months eleven days from the date of CFI's creation which coincides with this historic day of 14 September 2019 in which the life cycle of the film industry in Cameroon was about to be changed. The very significant and important venue which is the former Cameroon's presidency gives a clue about the importance of the occasion. The launching of the national artistic and cultural season relaunch dubbed RECAN 2019 was an occasion of the reorganization of the Cameroon Film Industry (CFI) to better meet up with the needs of local filmmakers through a federated structure meant to facilitate cohesion to ease dissemination of information, resources, capacity building and structuring of the dying sector. This meeting was chaired by Basseck Bakobio assisted by Chop Samuel the current president of SCAAP, the director of Cinema at MINAC and the board chair of the Cameroon Film industry CFI. On the other hand, apart from the board chair Mbeaoh Alex who diagnosed the CFI chapter; Agbor Gilbert Ebot, Takum Fred, Musing Derick and Billy Bob were the voices present to articulate the CFI motion in their respective capacities within the industry.

The bi-cultural nature of the sector attests to Cameroon's multicultural potential antagonized the meeting with the Anglo-Saxon filmmakers debating contrary to the ten regional approaches of federating the sector by convincing the French filmmakers about the need for the sector to retain its bi-cultural attributes in terms of organisation, culture, language and methodology in their respective approaches of making films; insisting that a melange of both systems may not appeal to the parties.  The meeting ended with a deadlock immediately a motion of equal representation was raised about those to be absorbed into a committee to continue with further deliberations to that effect by the English filmmakers. The meeting chairperson was totally against the motion of equal representation and rather opined that those to constitute the committee can come from any part of the country not necessarily on the basis of equality. The meeting saw its last minute in a fiasco with the meeting chairman affirming an impromptu call for those that will be selected into the committee to fine-tune the meeting's agenda which could not be exhausted in one sitting.

This meeting came at a period when most of the pioneers or stakeholders of the industry are either at log ahead or daggers drawn with each other, probably because of other diverse reasons but important to appreciate the united voice and support they put up with each other while in this very important meeting which is foreseen as the turning point of the film industry in Cameroon. While being hopeful that pioneers and front liners of the industry mobilize and reconcile their differences to pave the way to the preceding generations who expect nothing but an exemplary footprint, the powers that be should equally assist these pacesetters to achieve their goals in this very lucrative industry which has been relegated to the back in this country for too long.

Finally, it is very important to emphasise the drastic evolution of the CFI since the board was created in March 2013; the number of high-quality productions has increased tremendously. It is within the framework of the CFI that envisaged and daring productions started being realized such as Cameroon's longest TV Series (312 episodes) Bad Angel produced by Godwin Nganah, directed by Tanwie Elvis De Dadies, Rhumble Series (156 episodes) produced and directed by Billy Bob Lifongo are TV series aired on national TV which revolutionized the film industry, pushed the bars higher and created awareness about the industry's upgrade. After this major breakthrough other movies such as Samba, Life Point, A Man for the Weekend, Night in the Grass Field, A Good Time to Divorce, Two Ways, Bridge of Trust have gained recognition. This emerging trend has really been consistent thus giving a special position for the CFI which hopefully may lead the African Cinema in terms of production quality.

Producers
 Adela Elad
 Agbor Gilbert Ebot
 Asobo Desmond
 Daniel Kamwa
 Desiree Sanga
 chefor Leslie
 Enah Johnscot
 Kang Quintus
 Jean Pierre Dikonguè Pipa
 Ngan Jean
 Nkanya Nkwai
 Stephanie Tum
 Syndy Emade
 Prince Wilson
 Tamitan Bertrand

Directors
 Tanwie Elvis De dadies
 Enah John Scott
 Takong Delvis
 Musing Derick T
 Nkanya Nkwai
 Chinepo Cosson
 Neba Lawrence
 Billybob Ndive
 Paul Samba
 Victor Viyuoh
 Ngang Romanus
 Acha Fon
 Eystein Young Jr.
 Prince Wilson
 Tamitan Bertrand

Actors
 Achiri Victor
 Asobo Desmond
 Chu Eugene Chi 
 Epule Jeffrey
 Kang Quintus
 Lucie Memba
 Onyama Laura
 Solange Yijika
 Sumbai Ekane Epie
 Adambi Mbango
 Tamitan Bertrand
 Prince Wilson
 CY International (Comedian)

Distributors
 Ciné News Distribution
 Screen Awards – since 1995

See also
 List of Cameroonian films
 Cinema of Nigeria
 List of Cameroonian actors

References

 
Industry in Cameroon